Ibrahim Yaro (born 21 June 1996), is a Ghanaian professional footballer who plays for Medeama in the Ghana Premier League.

Professional career
With the 2019 season in Ghana unclear Yaro and teammate Kwasi Donsu were loaned to USL Championship team Colorado Springs Switchbacks with an option to buy. The option for both players was declined and they returned to Ghana after the 2019 USL Championship season ended.

International career
Yaro last appeared international for Ghana in December 2018 when he was called up by the Ghanaian U23 National Team for the U23 African Cup of Nations qualifier match against Togo.

Personal life
Yaro and his longtime girlfriend, Feli, were married in April 2018.

References

External links

USL bio

1996 births
Living people
Ghanaian footballers
Association football defenders
Colorado Springs Switchbacks FC players
USL Championship players